Lowtax may refer to:

 Byron (Low Tax) Looper, (1964 – 2013) American politician and convicted murderer
 Richard "Lowtax" Kyanka, (1976 – 2021) American internet personality and former owner of the website Something Awful